Conservation of Private Grazing Lands — Enacted in the 1996 farm bill (P.L. 104–127) and most recently amended by the 2002 farm bill (P.L. 107–171, Sec. 2502), this program provides coordinated technical, educational, and related assistance to preserve and enhance privately owned grazing lands.  It authorizes the creation of two grazing management demonstration districts.  Appropriations are authorized at $60 million annually from discretionary funds for FY2002 through FY2007.

The two Grazing Management Demonstration Districts are to be selected by the Secretary of Agriculture from landowner applications, where sound grazing practices will be promoted. Each district is to be supported by a technical advisory committee.

References 

United States Department of Agriculture programs